The cero (Scomberomorus regalis), also known as the pintado, kingfish,  cero mackerel, cerite or painted mackerel, is a ray-finned bony fish in the family Scombridae, better known as the mackerel family.  More specifically, this fish is a member of the tribe Scomberomorini, the Spanish mackerels, and is the type species of the genus Scomberomorus. It is similar in appearance and coloration to the Atlantic Spanish mackerel, Scomberomorus maculatus, except the cero has a longitudinal stripe in addition to the spots of the Atlantic Spanish mackerel.

The first dorsal fin is black anteriorly, the lateral line descends slowly from the shoulder without the sharp break seen on the king mackerel,  Scomberomorus cavalla.

It is found in the western Atlantic from Cape Cod through the Caribbean Sea and the Gulf of Mexico to Rio de Janeiro in Brazil.

References

External links
 

Scomberomorus
Fish of the Western Atlantic
Taxa named by Marcus Elieser Bloch
Fish described in 1793